Obrero (often called Barrio Obrero) is one of 40 subbarrios of Santurce in the municipality of San Juan, Puerto Rico. Obrero is the most populated subbarrio in Santurce. The Residencial Las Casas public housing is located in the area.

Demographics
In 2000, Obrero had a population of 11,467.

In 2010, Obrero had a population of 10,316 and a population density of 25,790 persons per square mile.

Hurricane Maria
Hurricane Maria which hit Puerto Rico on September 20, 2017 devastated Obrero with major flooding and winds that tore roofs off homes.

Gallery

See also
 
 List of communities in Puerto Rico

References

Santurce, San Juan, Puerto Rico
Municipality of San Juan